The Jicatuyo River is a river in the Santa Barbara Department in Honduras which flows into the Ulúa River.

See also
List of rivers of Honduras

References

Rivers of Honduras